Tainan National University of the Arts (TNNUA) is an arts university in Guantian District, Tainan, Taiwan. The campus is in the countryside; beside the campus there is a reservoir. Many international guest professors visit.

Han Pao-teh was commissioned by the Ministry of Education to head the preparation and planning of TNNUA in 1993. He was the architect of the main library flanked by galleries on either side of its main plaza. The university welcomed it first class of students in 1996.

TNNUAoffers undergraduate and graduate programs in various arts disciplines, including visual arts, performing arts, design, media arts, and cultural studies. The university also offers doctoral programs in interdisciplinary arts, cultural studies, and art theory and critique.

History
The Executive Yuan approved the establishment of the school in 1989. In 1993, the preparatory office was established. In July 1996, the school was established with the name Tainan National College of the Arts. In August 2004, it was renamed Tainan National University of the Arts.

Faculties
 College of Letters and Cultural Heritage
 College of Music
 College of Sound and Image Arts
 College of Visual Arts

See also
 List of universities in Taiwan

References

 
1996 establishments in Taiwan
Educational institutions established in 1996
Universities and colleges in Taiwan
Universities and colleges in Tainan